Kattiannan Arjunan is an Indian politician of the All India Anna Dravida Munnetra Kazhagam (AIADMK).

Politics 
He was elected to the Lok Sabha the lower house of Indian Parliament from Dharmapuri in 1980 as a member of the Dravida Munnetra Kazhagam (DMK). He then joined the AIADMK.

Arjunan was elected as a Member of the legislative assembly(MLA) from Tharamangalam, Salem district on 1989 as a member of the AIADMK and again elected as a MLA from Veerapandi on 1991 as a member of the AIADMK.

Early life 
Arjunan was born on 22 September 1944 at M. N. Patti Village, Mettur Taluk of Salem District. He has a B.sc degree from Loyola college, Madras. He got married on 24 November 1969.

Arjunan served as a Sub-Inspector of Police from 1967 to 1978 and as a Deputy Inspector of Police from 1978 to 1979.

References

External links
Official biographical sketch in Parliament of India website

1944 births
Living people
Dravida Munnetra Kazhagam politicians
India MPs 1980–1984
Lok Sabha members from Tamil Nadu
Tamil Nadu MLAs 1991–1996
All India Anna Dravida Munnetra Kazhagam politicians